KrisFlyer is the name given to the frequent flyer and airport lounge programs of Singapore Airlines.

Lounges

SilverKris Lounge

The SilverKris Lounge is Singapore Airlines premium lounge, available to departing Singapore Airlines Suites, First Class and Business Class passengers in addition to Solitaire PPS Club, PPS Club and KrisFlyer Elite Gold members travelling on Singapore Airlines. These lounges are located in the following locations:

The SilverKris Lounge at Changi Airport Terminal 3 are open from 0500 to 0230 hours daily, and are accessible to departing first class and business class passengers travelling on any Star Alliance flights. They feature internet workstations, wireless internet access, conference rooms, bars, restrooms, showers as well as dining and lounge areas.

The Private Room
The Private Room opened on 1 July 2008 and is located in the First Class section of the SilverKris Lounge in Terminal 3 at Changi Airport. Originally for the exclusive use of full-fare Singapore Airlines Suites and first class passengers, the entry requirements were relaxed in 2009 to include access for all Suites and First Class passengers. It features a restaurant as well as two private rooms, as well as lounge facilities, business centre, and a buffet and dining room.

KrisFlyer Gold Lounge
The KrisFlyer Gold Lounges are located in both Terminals 2 and 3 of Changi Airport adjacent to the SilverKris Lounges and are accessible by departing KrisFlyer Gold members as well as Star Alliance Gold members travelling in economy class on Singapore Airlines or other Star Alliance flights. 

The KrisFlyer Gold Lounge features buffet and dining areas, televisions, lounge areas, Internet workstations as well as complimentary wireless internet, but unlike the SilverKris Lounge, does not feature bathrooms or showers.

Frequent flyer programme
Singapore Airlines' frequent flyer programme has two categories:

KrisFlyer
Miles are earned and redeemed on Singapore Airlines own services as well as with KrisFlyer partners. Partners include all Star Alliance members, Virgin Atlantic, Virgin Australia, and numerous hotel chains and car-hire companies. KrisFlyer is divided into KrisFlyer, KrisFlyer Elite Silver and KrisFlyer Elite Gold, which correspond to Star Alliance Silver and Gold, respectively.

The 12-month period is predefined according to when a passenger initially applied for KrisFlyer membership, so travelling  over a 12-month period may not qualify for Silver status unless it corresponds with the 12-month period assigned to them by Singapore Airlines.

Singapore Airlines flights in booking class G (group and promotional fares) earn no miles, while Singapore Airlines flights in booking classes V, Q, N and T (promotional fares) will receive between 10% to 50% of mileage

The PPS Club 
Priority Passenger Service (PPS) is for passengers who have accumulated S$25,000 worth of PPS Value within a year. PPS Value is acquired while flying Singapore Airlines Suites, First Class or Business Class on Singapore Airlines. The PPS is divided into the PPS Club, Solitaire PPS Club and the Solitaire PPS Club Life.

A member with PPS Club status will qualify for Solitaire PPS Club by accumulating PPS Value of S$250,000 within five years. Benefits are equal to Solitaire PPS Club members but did not have a re-qualification criteria. Singapore Airlines has since ceased accepting new Solitaire Life PPS Club members.

All PPS members have priority check-in, baggage handling, guaranteed Economy Class seats when wait-listed on Business and First Class and have access to the business-class section of the SilverKris Lounge. Solitaire PPS members and their spouses also access First Class check-in and the First Class sections of the SilverKris Lounge.

See also

 List of airlines of Singapore
 Transport in Singapore

References

External links

 

Singapore Airlines
Frequent flyer programs
Temasek Holdings
Singaporean brands